Siddhartha Deb (born 1970) is an Indian author who was born in Meghalaya and grew up in Shillong in northeastern India. He was educated in India and at Columbia University, US. Deb began his career in journalism as a sports journalist in Calcutta in 1994 before moving to Delhi to continue regular journalism until 1998. His first novel, The Point of Return, is semi-autobiographical in nature and is set in a fictional hill-station that closely resembles Shillong in India's Northeast. His second novel, Surface, also set in Northeast India, is about a disillusioned Sikh journalist. His first non-fiction book, The Beautiful And the Damned: A Portrait of the New India was published in June 2011 by Viking Penguin. He has also contributed to The Boston Globe, The Guardian, The Nation, New Statesman, Harper's, the London Review of Books, and The Times Literary Supplement. He currently teaches creative writing at The New School in New York.

Awards and honors
2012 PEN/Open Book, The Beautiful and the Damned: Life in the New India
2012 Orwell Prize (shortlist), The Beautiful and the Damned: Life in the New India

Bibliography

Fiction
 
  published by Picador in the UK as 
  a collaborative project published as a limited edition book with photographer Mitch Epstein

Non-fiction
 

Articles

See also
 Indian literature
 Indian English literature
 Literature from North East India

References

External links
siddharthadeb.com
In Conversation: Winners and Losers in the “New India”: Siddhartha Deb with Scott Sherman, The Brooklyn Rail
"On Change in India" Guernica: Magazine of Art and Politics (September 1, 2011)
Siddhartha Deb articles New Republic

1970 births
Living people
Novelists from Meghalaya
University of Calcutta alumni
Columbia University alumni
The New School faculty
Indian male writers
20th-century Indian journalists
Journalists from Meghalaya